Geo Kahani is a premium entertainment network by Geo Group, which airs a variety of ended series from Geo TV, and sometimes produces original programming.

Current programming

Reruns of ended series 
 Tum Se Hi Talluq Hai
 Banno
 Darr Khuda Say
 Kahin Deep Jaley
 Kurulus Osman Season 2
 Saibaan
 Dolly Darling
 Nadaaniyaan

Former programming

Original programming

Dramas
 Aas
 Champa Aur Chambeli
 Devraniyaan
 Ghar Aik Jannat
 Jeevan Saathi
 Naagin
 Kiran
 Kyun Hai Tu
 Soha Aur Savera

Talk shows

 Subh-e-Pakistan
 Subh Ki Kahani
 Iftar Mulaqat

Acquired Programming

From Geo Entertainment
 Bharosa Pyaar Tera
 Raaz-E-Ulfat
 Ghar Ek Jannat
 Jeevan Saathi
 Mann Ke Moti
 Yeh Zindagi Hai
 Yeh Kaisi Mohabbat Hai
 Malika-e-Aliya
 Malika-e-Aliya Season 2
 Umm-E-Haniya
 Roshni
 Saaya
 Nanhi
 Ay Dil Tu Bata
 Kurulus Osman Season 1
Meri Maa
Naadaniyaan
Piya Naam Ka Diya
Yaariyan
Khoobseerat
Kahin Deep Jaley
 Khaali Haath
 Munafiq
 Joru Ka Ghulam
 Sangdil
 Kam Zarf
 Aap Ki Kaneez
 Bandhay Aik Dor Say
 Ab Dekh Khuda Kya Karta Hai
 Mohabbat Tumse Nafrat Hai
 Inteqam
 Saaya (season 2)
 Yaariyan
 Romeo Weds Heer

Indian
 Badi Bahu
 Bhoomi Kay Sapnay
 CID
 Darr Sabko Lagta Hai
 Doli Armaano Ki
 Dosri Shaadi
 Mrs.Kaushik Ki Paanch Bahuein
 Ek Tha Raja Ek Thi Rani
 Haasil
 Jeet Gayi Toh Piya Morey
 Jodha Akbar
 Kaala Teeka
 Kumkum Bhagya
 Kundali Bhagya
 Mehrunnisa
 Razia Sultan
 Satrangi Sasural
 Suno Pratibha
 Yeh Kahan Aa Gaye Hum
 Yeh Vaada Raha

Turkish
 Intekam
 Iffet
 Mera Ishq
 Mera Sultan
 Muhabbat
 Noor
 Sheharzaad
Bewafai

References

Geo TV original programming